Jean-Pierre Nicolas (born 21 October 1938) is a French politician. He represented Eure's 2nd constituency in the National Assembly of France from 2002 to 2012,  and is a member of the Union for a Popular Movement

References

1938 births
Living people
Politicians from Moulins, Allier
Politicians from Normandy
Union for a Popular Movement politicians
The Republicans (France) politicians
Deputies of the 12th National Assembly of the French Fifth Republic
Deputies of the 13th National Assembly of the French Fifth Republic
Mayors of places in Normandy